Lukhi Apri Nugroho (born 20 April 1993) is an Indonesian badminton player. He is a doubles specialist from PB. Djarum, and has joined the club since 2010. Nogroho won the mixed doubles title at the 2011 Asian Junior Championships when he was partnered with Ririn Amelia.

Achievements

Asian Junior Championships 
Mixed doubles

BWF International Challenge/Series (4 titles, 4 runners-up) 
Men's doubles

Mixed doubles

  BWF International Challenge tournament
  BWF International Series tournament

Performance timeline

National team 
 Junior level

Individual competitions 
 Junior level

 Senior level

References 

1993 births
Living people
Sportspeople from Central Java
Indonesian male badminton players
21st-century Indonesian people